ShiftyLook was a subsidiary of Bandai Namco Holdings that was focused on revitalizing older Namco franchises, with their first step being video game webcomics based on the company's various franchises. The subsidiary later offered webtoons, anime, playable games, music, message boards, and graphic novels as well. ShiftyLook regularly held substantial exhibitions at large US comics conventions, having a major booth presences and holding large giveaways of promotional merchandise.

ShiftyLook shut down on September 30, 2014.

History
ShiftyLook was headed by editor-in-chief Robert Pereyda. The idea behind the company was to revive Namco's more obscure, dormant video game franchises for mediums such as webcomics and animations. Pereyda believed that entertainment formats like webcomics were largely successful, and that if these intellectual properties become popular through them, it could garner more interest in those series and make Namco Bandai interested in creating new games for them. Namco Bandai also believed that ShiftyLook was a venue for content creators to collaborate on projects, and to establish working relations with artists and developers for future projects. In an interview with CRB.com, Pereyda stated: "Basically, what we're doing is taking a look at stuff that's forgotten IPs, stuff that's sleeping, stuff that — just to be honest — some people don't care about and thinking what we can do with it. This is a big system and we know that not everything's going to succeed, but if some of them can make it to the big time, we've done a good job. We're casting a really wide net. We're doing different styles, different artists, different kinds of titles, just filling out a whole matrix of different things we can do and then seeing where that goes." If the webcomics were successful, Pereyda hoped that content such as merchandise and print versions would be available as well.

ShiftyLook officially launched on March 9, 2012. Five webcomics were announced to begin production under the company; Bravoman, Xevious, Sky Kid, Rocket Fox, and Alien Confidential: Black and White. Comics were made available for free on the website, all without advertisements aside from those for Bandai Namco's other projects. In June 2012, ShiftyLook announced that Japanese manga artist Hitoshi Ariga would begin work on a webcomic based on Klonoa, becoming the first ShiftyLook comic created outside North America. To increase their viewer base, ShiftyLook regularly attended fan conventions in their own booth, where they featured artists behind some of their comics as well as merchandise. A YouTube channel was launched in 2013, featuring short animated series based on Bravoman and Mappy. The same year, Namco Bandai released an endless runner game based on Bravoman, titled Bravoman: Binja Bash!, for iOS and Android devices. ShiftyLook also published Wonder Momo: Typhoon Booster, a sequel to Wonder Momo developed by WayForward, and Namco High, a comical dating simulator game designed by Homestuck creator Andrew Hussie. A five episode anime series based on Wonder Momo began in January 2014 on Crunchyroll.

On March 10, 2014, ShiftyLook announced that their site would no longer be updated beginning March 20, and by September 30 the company and website would be shut down entirely. They also announced that their YouTube channel, mobile games, and other digital merchandise would be pulled. The shutdown was announced by company executive Casy Casoni, who said that ShiftyLook "battled the video games abyss and won, which means it's time for us to move on and let the hit-makers play with some new toys." Before the company's closure, Udon Entertainment published hardcover books for Bravoman, Katamari, and Wonder Momo that featured the first 100 strips. A print version of Galaga was announced but never released.

Writing for Publishers Weekly, Calvin Reid felt that ShiftyLook "looks to have failed overall" as only a few properties, namely Bravoman, Wonder Momo, and Katamari, had reached the success the company had hoped for. Rich Johnston of Bleeding Cool believes that financial difficulties were to blame for the company's downfall, despite the creative talent and marketing push behind it. Matt Moylan, the CEO of Udon and the writer for 300 strips of the Bravoman comic, described his work at ShiftyLook being "one of the most creatively rewarding experiences [he has] ever had in comics." Moylan stated that Bandai Namco likely invested too much money into ShiftyLook up front and that plans to monetize its productions did not materialize until it was too late.

List of webcomics

See also
 Namco Generations

References

Webcomic publishing companies
Former Bandai Namco Holdings subsidiaries
Internet properties established in 2012
Internet properties disestablished in 2014